

The 2004 Miyun stampede (Chinese: 2004年北京密云灯会踩踏事故) also known as Beijing lantern festival stampede was a human stampede that occurred in a crowded lantern festival in Miyun District, Beijing, resulting in 37 deaths and 15 persons injured.

Background 

The Lantern Festival or the Spring Lantern Festival is a Chinese festival celebrated on the fifteenth day of the first month in the lunisolar Chinese calendar. It marks the final day of the traditional Chinese New Year celebrations, and falls on some day in February or March in the Gregorian calendar.

Disaster 
At the Mihong Park, when people were celebrating the lantern festival on a bridge, a spectator tripped on an open grate and fell, causing a chain-reaction of people falling upon each others.

Wu Kun, a spokesman for the Beijing city government described the stampede:One person fell down on a grate in the park and caused many people to fall down, there was a stampede. It was a lot of people. I'm not sure how many. These things are packed.

Aftermath 
After the accident, Beijing Mayor Liu Qi, rushed to the scene of the disaster, and Hu Jintao and Premier Wen Jiabao ordered local authorities to investigate how the accident happened and "to try their best to save the injured and make suitable arrangement for the families of the dead."

Two police officers, Sun Yong and Chen Bainian, were sentenced to three years in jail for dereliction of duty by the 2nd Branch of Beijing Municipal People's Procuratorate.

References

External links 
 37 killed in Beijing lantern festival stampede, China Daily (February 6, 2004)
 At Least 37 Die In China Stampede, CBS News (February 5, 2004)
 Stampede Kills 37 in Lantern Festival, China Internet Information Center (February 6, 2004)
 Festival stampede in China kills 37, United Press International (February 5, 2004)

2004 disasters in China
February 2004 events in China
Human stampedes in 2004
Miyun District
Man-made disasters in China